Rehana Sultan (born 19 November 1950) is an Indian actress best known for her debut role in the acclaimed 1970 film Dastak which won her the National Film Award for Best Actress. A graduate of Film and Television Institute of India (FTII), Pune, she is also known for another bold role in the film Chetna (1970), which got her typecast thus ending her film career, despite its promising start. She said "The sex in my films was not forced, but part of the narrative. Today, I feel these scenes are used for commercial reasons. All I can say is Babuda was ahead of his times.”

Biography
Born and raised in Allahabad in a Baháʼí Faith family, she graduated from high school in 1967, and was selected in the same year to study acting at FTII. After she graduated with a sexy role in Vishwanath Ayengar's diploma film Shadi Ki Pehli Salgirah (1967), she got her break in a feature film in Rajinder Singh Bedi's Dastak (1970), making her the first actress from the Institute to land a lead role in the film industry. She won the National Film Award for her role in that film. In the same year she also played the lead role in the film Chetna which was shot in 28 days along with the shooting of Dastak. That film was about the rehabilitation of prostitutes, and her role changed the portrayal of sex workers in Hindi cinema.

Her sexy roles brought her success but also limited her choice of roles in future films. She had roles in Haar Jeet (1972), Prem Parvat (1973), and the famous political satire Kissa Kursi Ka (1977). In 1984, after starring in Vijay Anand's Hum Rahen Na Rahen (1984) with  Shabana Azmi, she married writer-director B. R. Ishara, who had directed Chetna. She also appeared in a Punjabi movie Putt Jattan De (1981) with Shatrughan Sinha.

Filmography

References

External links
 
 

Living people
Actresses from Uttar Pradesh
Indian film actresses
Actresses in Hindi cinema
Film and Television Institute of India alumni
Best Actress National Film Award winners
Indian Bahá'ís
20th-century Bahá'ís
21st-century Bahá'ís
1950 births
20th-century Indian actresses